John Henry Haaren (born August 13, 1855, New York, New York – d. September 23, 1916, Brooklyn, New York) was an American educator and historian.

Haaren's father was German and his mother Irish and English. He studied under Prof. N. M. Butler at Columbia University, 1889–91, before becoming a teacher in New York. In 1907 he became Associate Superintendent of Schools in New York, increasing the number and efficiency of kindergartens and starting classes to teach English to foreigners.

He was president of the department of pedagogy in the Brooklyn Institute. Haaren High School (which was located on 10th Avenue between 58th and 59th Streets in Manhattan) was named in his honor. The Charles B. J. Snyder-designed school which was initially DeWitt Clinton High School is now Haaren Hall on the campus of the John Jay College of Criminal Justice

Works

References

External links
 
 
 

Historians from New York (state)
American educators
American Roman Catholics
Writers from New York City
1855 births
1916 deaths
Columbia University alumni